The 1975–76 Kansas Jayhawks men's basketball team represented the University of Kansas during the 1975–76 NCAA Division I men's basketball season.

Roster
Norm Cook
Clint Johnson
Ken Koenigs
Herb Nobles
Paul Mokeski
Milt Gibson
Bradley Ridgway
Reuben Shelton
Brad Sanders
Chris Barnthouse
Arnie Baum
Bob Worthington

Schedule

References

Kansas Jayhawks men's basketball seasons
Kansas
Kansas Jay
Kansas Jay